Lumino may refer to:

Lumino, Switzerland in south-eastern Switzerland
Lumino, Uganda in Busia District, Uganda
Lumino (band), a hip-hop group based in Mongolia